From March 6 to May 18, 1928, voters of the Republican Party chose its nominee for president in the 1928 United States presidential election. The nominee was selected through a series of primary elections and caucuses culminating in the 1928 Republican National Convention held from June 12 to June 15, 1928, in Kansas City, Missouri.

See also
1928 Democratic Party presidential primaries

References